Nyctopais mysteriosus is a species of beetle in the family Cerambycidae. It was described by James Thomson in 1858. It is known from the Democratic Republic of the Congo, Cameroon, and Gabon.

Varietas
 Nyctopais mysteriosus var. tripuncta Jordan, 1903
 Nyctopais mysteriosus var. fasciatus Jordan, 1894

References

Tragocephalini
Beetles described in 1858